Batwheels is an American computer-animated superhero children's television series that premiered on September 17, 2022, on HBO Max, and on October 17, 2022, on Cartoon Network's preschool block, Cartoonito.

Plot
The Bat-Family's vehicles are brought to life by the Batcomputer to form the "Batwheels", a team led by the Batmobile or "Bam", to fight crime in Gotham City.

Characters

The Batwheels
 The Batmobile / Bam (voiced by Jacob Bertrand), the insecure leader of the Batwheels.
 Redbird / Red (voiced by Jordan Reed), Robin's car and the youngest of the Batwheels.
 Bibi (voiced by Madigan Kacmar), Batgirl's small but impulsive motorcycle.
 Buff (voiced by Noah Bentley), a good-hearted monster truck who serves as the Batwheels' muscle.
 The Batwing / Wing (voiced by Lilimar), Batman's sophisticated and confident supersonic jet.
 The Batcomputer / BC (voiced by Kimberly D. Brooks), the team's trainer, supervisor, dispatcher, and mother figure.
 M.O.E. (Mobile Operation Expert) (voiced by Mick Wingert), Batman's sarcastic robot mechanic.

The Bat-Family
 Bruce Wayne / Batman (voiced by Ethan Hawke), a vigilante from Gotham City and father figure to the Batwheels. Hawke previously turned down the role for Joel Schumacher's Batman Forever.
 Duke Thomas / Robin (voiced by A.J. Hudson), a mystery-loving member of the Bat-Family who wants to prove himself in the eyes of Batman.
 Cassandra Cain / Batgirl (voiced by Leah Lewis), a daredevil tech-savvy member of the Bat-Family, who serves as a "big sister" figure in the group.
 Oliver Queen / Green Arrow (voiced by MacLeod Andrews), a vigilante archer from Star City and a friend of Batman's.

The Rogues' Gallery
 The Joker (voiced by Mick Wingert), Batman's archenemy and the self-proclaimed "Clown Prince of Crime".
 Harley Quinn (voiced by Chandni Parekh), The Joker's partner-in-crime and girlfriend.
 Selina Kyle / Catwoman (voiced by Gina Rodriguez), a cat-themed burglar.
 Oswald Cobblepot / The Penguin (voiced by Jess Harnell), an elegant penguin-like criminal.
 Victor Fries / Mr. Freeze (voiced by Regi Davis), an ice-themed supervillain with a mechanical suit.
 Edward Nigma / The Riddler (voiced by SungWon Cho), a riddle-obsessed criminal.
 Toyman (voiced by James Arnold Taylor), a toy-themed villain who is Superman’s enemy.
 Pamela Isley / Poison Ivy (voiced by Kailey Snider), a plant-themed villain.

The Legion of Zoom
 Prank (voiced by Griffin Burns), Joker's funny and pranking van.
 Jestah (voiced by Alexandra Novelle), Harley's fun-loving ATV.
 Quizz (voiced by Josey Montana McCoy), Riddler's quiz loving helicopter.
 Ducky (voiced by Ariyan Kassam), Penguin's mischief-causing duck on a boat with wheels vehicle.
 Snowy (voiced by Xolo Maridueña), Mr. Freeze's bad but gentle snow crawler.
 Badcomputer (voiced by SungWon Cho), A.I. computer software inside a scoreboard who wants to replace the Bat Computer as the most powerful computer on Earth.
 Crash (voiced by Tom Kenny), Badcomputer's crash-dummy like robot minion.

Episodes

Shorts

Production

Development
In October 2020, it was announced that an animated preschool series centered around the Batmobile was in development at Warner Bros. Animation, set to premiere on Cartoon Network's then-upcoming preschool block Cartoonito and HBO Max. According to Tom Ascheim, president of the now-defunct Warner Bros. Global Kids, Young Adults and Classics, the series was greenlit due to its concept being fit for the studio's focus on preschool projects. Michael G. Stern serves as developer and co-executive producer, with Simon J. Smith as supervising producer, and Steven Fink and Caroline Karmel producing. Stern was brought into the project early in development, as WB explored ideas for preschool-oriented DC shows, while Smith was brought after Stern wrote the first scripts for the series. In December 2022, the series was renewed for a second season, with Stern and Smith being promoted to executive producers.

Writing
While writing the series, Stern wanted to avoid "kiddifying" the characters, as he felt children should be introduced to the characters through faithful portrayals and was also requested to respect the characters. For Batman, he wrote the character to stay faithful to most interpretations, with only his violence being toned down. He also wrote the villains with "a lane" that stayed faithful to their classical portrayals while still fitting the target audience, such as portraying Harley Quinn as a fun-loving prankster.

When creating the Batwheels, the writers wanted them to be perceived as "lovable" and "fun" characters for the audience, in order to avoid the children only watching the show for Batman. In order to accomplish this, they tested the personalities for each character with a test group, who received the characters positively. The writers also wanted to avoid portraying the Legion of Zoom as mere copies of their owners, to which they gave each vehicle their own characteristics, such as portraying Prank, the Joker's van, as "a surfer dude".

Music
The series' score was composed by Alex Geringas, while the theme song was performed and produced by Andy Sturmer, who previously composed the themes for the series The Batman and Batman: The Brave and the Bold. Sturmer also co-wrote the theme alongside Stern.

Notes

References

External links
 
 
 
 

2020s American animated television series
2020s American children's television series
2020s preschool education television series
2022 American television series debuts
American children's animated action television series
American children's animated adventure television series
American children's animated science fantasy television series
American children's animated superhero television series
American computer-animated television series
American preschool education television series
Animated Batman television series
Animated preschool education television series
Animated television shows based on DC Comics
Cartoon Network original programming
Cartoonito original programming
English-language television shows
HBO Max original programming
Television series by Warner Bros. Animation